The Women's individual pursuit at the 2014 Commonwealth Games, was part of the cycling programme, which took place on 25 July 2014.

Results

Qualifying

Finals

References

Women's individual pursuit
Cycling at the Commonwealth Games – Women's individual pursuit
Comm